Komrani is a village in the municipality of Pale-Prača, Bosnia and Herzegovina. According to the 2013 census, the village has a population of 20.

Demographics

Historical evolution of the population in the settlement

Distribution of the population by nationalities (1991)

References

Populated places in Pale-Prača